Scottie Phillips (born October 6, 1997) is an American football running back who is a free agent. He played college football at the University of Mississippi.

High school career
Attending South Jones, Phillips ran for over 1600 yards and 22 touchdowns in his senior year, averaging 163 yards per game. As a junior, Phillips ran for 571 yards and 4 touchdowns, averaging 81.6 yards per game. Phillips was named a 2015 MAC all-state first-team selection.

College career

Jones County Junior College
Phillips was ranked as a 3-4 star Junior College prospect. As a freshman, Phillips ran for 1,212 yards and 14 touchdowns, averaging 123.6 yards per game; Earning an honorable mention in the NCJAA All-America honors. In his sophomore year, Phillips would run for 1,070 yards alongside 13 touchdowns, propelling him to the team leading scorer.

University of Mississippi (Ole Miss)

2018
For his Junior Year, Scottie Phillips would enroll with the Division I Ole Miss Rebels. In 2018, Phillips would start in 10 games, playing in one additional game. Phillips would rack up 14 all-purpose touchdowns, 12 of which were rushing, ranking for fifth and third in the SEC respectively. Phillips also ran for 927 yards, which was ninth in the SEC. In his first game at Ole Miss, in Week 1 against Texas Tech Phillips recorded 204 yards and 2 touchdowns, becoming the eighth Ole Miss running back to surpass 200-yards in a single game, winning SEC Offensive Player of the Week for his efforts. As of 2019, he holds the Ole Miss school record for most yards by a running back in their debut. During Week 10 against Texas A&M, Phillips would rush only 3 times for 4 yards before getting injured on the sixth play of the game. After missing Week 11, Phillips would serve in the backup role in Week 12 against Mississippi State to finish out the season.

2019
Entering his 2019 campaign with the Rebels, Phillips was considered to be the lead running back on the team, starting over five-star prospect Jerrion Ealy. Phillips had considerable expectations for his 2019 season.

College statistics

Professional career

Houston Texans 
Phillips signed with the Houston Texans as an undrafted free agent on April 27, 2020. He was waived on September 5, 2020 and signed to the practice squad the next day. Phillips was elevated to the active roster on September 10 and November 21 for the team's weeks 1 and 11 games against the Kansas City Chiefs and New England Patriots, and reverted to the practice squad after each game. He was promoted to the active roster on November 25, 2020.

On November 9, 2021, Phillips was placed on injured reserve. He was waived/injured on May 2, 2022 and placed on injured reserve. On June 16, 2022, Phillips was released by the Texans with an injury settlement.

Seattle Sea Dragons 
On November 17, 2022, Phillips was drafted by the Seattle Sea Dragons of the XFL.

References

External links
  Sports Reference (college)
 Ole Miss Rebels Bio

1997 births
Living people
Players of American football from Mississippi
American football running backs
Ole Miss Rebels football players
People from Ellisville, Mississippi
Houston Texans players
Seattle Sea Dragons players
Jones County Bobcats football players